Mehmet Tunç (born August 15, 1997) is a Turkish male Paralympian athlete competing in the T11 disability class of sprint and long jump events. He is a member of Gaziantep BB Disabled SK.

He won the silver medal in the 200m T11 event at the 2016 IPC Athletics European Championships held in Grosseto, Italy.

He competed in the 200m T11, 400m T11 and Men's long jump T11 events at the 2016 Paralympics in Rio de Janeiro, Brazil.

References

1997 births
Living people
Male competitors in athletics with disabilities
Turkish blind people
Visually impaired sprinters
Turkish male sprinters
Turkish male long jumpers
Paralympic athletes of Turkey
Athletes (track and field) at the 2016 Summer Paralympics
Paralympic sprinters
21st-century Turkish people